Adrenal fatigue or hypoadrenia is a pseudo-scientific term used by alternative medicine providers to suggest that the adrenal glands are exhausted and unable to produce adequate quantities of hormones, primarily cortisol, due to chronic stress or infections. There is no scientific basis for the existence of adrenal fatigue, and the term should not be confused with a number of actual forms of adrenal dysfunction such as adrenal insufficiency or Addison's disease.

The term "adrenal fatigue" was invented in 1998 by chiropractor James Wilson and applied to a collection of mostly non-specific symptoms. There is no scientific evidence supporting the concept of adrenal fatigue, and it is not recognized as a diagnosis by the scientific or medical communities. Neither the condition nor the symptoms have any stable or recognized definition. A systematic review found no evidence for the condition, confirming the consensus among mainstream endocrinologists that it is a myth.

Blood or salivary testing is sometimes offered, but there is no evidence that adrenal fatigue exists or can be tested for. The concept of adrenal fatigue has given rise to an industry of dietary supplements marketed to treat the condition. These supplements are largely unregulated in the U.S., are ineffective, costly, and in some cases may be dangerous.

See also
Hypocortisolism
 List of topics characterized as pseudoscience

References

External links

Adrenal Fatigue from the Endocrine Society

Alternative diagnoses
Pseudoscience